The Lancia Flat-4 engine is an aluminum, pushrod flat-four (boxer) engine made by Lancia for the Flavia from 1960 through 1984. Though it was a pushrod engine, it was advanced for the time. The pushrod version of the Lancia boxer was only ever used in the Flavia, and its derivatives including the Lancia 2000. In 1976, a new overhead cam engine based on a similar layout was designed and brought into production in 2 and 2.5-litre displacements for the Gamma.

Pushrod

1500
The original version was the  introduced in 1960; it used an  bore and stroke. It was revised on 1963 with a smaller  bore and a longer  stroke, thus displacing . Production ceased in 1970.

1800
The first 1800 was a  introduced in 1962. It used an  bore and stroke. One year later it was replaced by a true  engine thanks to a longer  stroke. In 1967 appeared the  version using an  bore and stroke.

2000
The  2000 version was the ultimate Flavia engine. In 1971, the 2.0 L produced , and in the HF Coupé in 1972 it produced . This engine was produced from 1968 through 1974.

OHC
Lancia developed the large light-alloy overhead camshaft 2.0-litre and 2.5-litre flat-4 engines specifically for the Lancia Gamma, rather than using Fiat derived engines as used in the Beta and Montecarlo and were in production between 1976 and 1984.

2000

2500
The  engine was initially available with twin-choke Weber carburetors, but in the last few years of production it was equipped with fuel injection. In both forms, it produced  at 5400 rpm and  torque at 3000 rpm.

References

Flat-4
Boxer engines
Gasoline engines by model